Les Ordons (995 m) is a mountain of the Jura, located north-east of the Col des Rangiers in the canton of Jura. It houses the Les Ordons Transmission Tower.

References

Mountains of the Jura
Mountains of the canton of Jura
Mountains of Switzerland
Mountains of Switzerland under 1000 metres